William Mikelbrencis (born 25 February 2004) is a French professional footballer who plays for German  club Hamburger SV.

Early life 
Born in Forbach, Lorraine, William Mikelbrencis started playing football in the nearby Montbronn, before joining the FC Metz academy in 2015.

Club career 
Having made his first training sessions with the Ligue 1 squad, Mikelbrencis signed his first professional contract with the club from Metz in April 2021. He started the following season playing with the reserve team in National 2, scoring his first goal on the 6 November, against Sainte-Geneviève.

Having played his first senior game in early January 2022—delivering an assist during a 1–0 home friendly win against CS Sedan Ardennes—he made his professional debut for Metz on the 9 January, starting the Ligue 1 game against Strasbourg as right-back in a 3-4-3 formation.

In a difficult context between the injuries and the players away for the AFCON 2021, he made a first good impression despite his team losing 2–0 at home (his team was only losing by a goal when he was subbed for Pape Ndiaga Yade).

On 31 August 2022, Mikelbrencis signed a four-year contract with Hamburger SV in Germany.

International career 
A youth international for France since he played for the under-16 in 2019, he later was selected with the under-17—only playing friendlies during a covid pandemic context—before becoming a member of the under-18 in 2021, delivering his first assist during a 3–0 friendly away win against Italy.

References

External links

2004 births
Sportspeople from Moselle (department)
Footballers from Grand Est
Living people
French footballers
France youth international footballers
Association football defenders
People from Forbach
FC Metz players
Hamburger SV players
Ligue 1 players
Ligue 2 players
Championnat National 2 players
French expatriate footballers
Expatriate footballers in Germany
French expatriate sportspeople in Germany